St John's is a Gaelic Athletic Association club based in Carraroe and the eastern ward of Sligo, Republic of Ireland. It is one of the newer clubs in the county, having been formed in 1987 after a re-organisation of the GAA structures in the Sligo urban area. The club's grounds, formerly known as Cuilbeg, have been renamed Stenson Park in memory of former Sligo player and Curry/St John's club man Johnny Stenson, and were formally opened in October 2012 by GAA President Liam O'Neill.

In 2013, St John's seniors won ten games out of a possible eleven and contested the Division One League final for the very first time in their short history against Tourlestrane but lost. Currently the club fields Senior, Intermediate and Junior A teams and traditionally draws its players from Carraroe, Cairns Hill, Cranmore, Garavogue and Mail Coach Road which are predominantly areas from Sligo town.

St John's are yet to make an appearance in the Sligo Senior Football Championship final, but have made four semi-final appearances. The club have also won a Connacht Junior Club Football Championship title in 1999 when they defeated Monivea Abbeyknockmoy of Galway in the final in Tuam (Abbeyknockmoy had beaten St John's heavily in the group stage)

In the 2014 sligo county championship semi final St John's suffered a heavy defeat to arch rivals St Mary's

2015 was a disastrous year for St John's as they finished bottom of the division 1 league and bottom of the championship group meaning relegation to intermediate championship and division 2 league for 2016.

The 2016 intermediate championship ended with a defeat to eventual beaten finalists Geevagh at the quarter final stage and a 4th place finish in division 2.

St John's were also beaten by St Farnan's in the Benson cup final and beaten finalists also in the junior division 4 final by Tourlestrane.

But lifted the county junior b championship for the third time by defeating Easkey sea blues in the final to round off a good year for the club.

St John's won the intermediate championship in 2017 after defeating St Farnan's in a replay by 1-14 to 0-12 .

It is the first non-smoking club in Sligo, leading to chairman Seamus Casey being presented with an award by Dublin player Brian Fenton at Croke Park.

Notable players
 Barnes Murphy – All Star: 1974
 Charlie Harrison – All Star: 2010
 David Rooney

Achievements
 Sligo Senior Football League (Division 1):
 Runners up 2013
 Connacht Junior Club Football Championship: (1)
 1999
 Sligo Intermediate Football Championship: (2)
 2000, 2017
 Sligo Junior Football Championship: (3)
 1989, 1999, 2013
 Sligo Junior B Football Championship: (3)
 2009, 2013, 2016
 Sligo Under 21 'B' Football Championship: (1)
 2004
 Sligo Under 20 Football Championship: (1)
 2011
 Sligo Minor Football Championship: (4)
 1998, 1999, 2002, 2006
 Sligo Under-16 Football Championship: (8)
 1998, 1999, 2000, 2002, 2003, 2005, 2008, 2009
 Sligo Under-14 Football Championship: (8)
 1962, 1964, 1994, 1995, 1997, 2001, 2003, 2007
 Sligo Senior Football League (Division 2): (1)
 2009
 Sligo Intermediate Football League Division 3 (ex Div. 2): (1)
 2006
 Sligo Junior Football League (Division 5): 93)
 1988, 1999, 2010
 Benson Cup: (1)
2008

References

Gaelic games clubs in County Sligo
Sport in Sligo (town)